Victoria Snow (born 1954/55) is a Canadian actress. She is best known for her recurring roles as Mary Margaret Skalany in Kung Fu: The Legend Continues and Dee White in Cra$h & Burn, and her starring role as Frances Hunter in Paradise Falls.

Career
Born in Ancaster, Ontario, Snow had her first break as an actress when she was promoted from a minor role to the lead in a Stratford Festival production of the musical Happy New Year in 1979, after original lead Virginia Sandifur was forced to withdraw due to illness.

Career 
Snow played the lead role in a production of Medea, directed by John Neville at Halifax's Neptune Theatre, and played Nancy Blake in a 1985 production of The Women at the Shaw Festival.

She has also had supporting or guest roles in the series 9B, E.N.G., Katts and Dog, The Newsroom, Traders, Total Recall 2070, Queer as Folk, Blue Murder, This Is Wonderland, Flashpoint, Republic of Doyle, Warehouse 13, Haven and Slasher, the television films True Confessions of a Hollywood Starlet, Thicker Than Blood: The Larry McLinden Story, Anne of Green Gables: The Continuing Story and Waking Up Wally: The Walter Gretzky Story, and the theatrical films Millennium and Stardom.

Snow portrayed the mother of Bryan Mills (Clive Standen) in the television series Taken, a prequel to the film trilogy of the same name, in 2017 and 2018. In 2021, she appeared as a federal judge in the film Dark Web: Cicada 3301.

Awards
Snow is a two-time Gemini Award winner, winning Best Lead Actress in a Dramatic Program or Mini-Series at the 3rd Gemini Awards in 1988 for Daughters of the Country and Best Guest Performance in a Series at the 5th Gemini Awards in 1990 for an episode of Street Legal. She was also a nominee for Best Actress in a Continuing Leading Dramatic Role at the 20th Gemini Awards in 2005 and the 25th Gemini Awards in 2010 for Paradise Falls, and a nominee for Best Actress in a Dramatic Program or Mini-Series at the 21st Gemini Awards in 2006 for her performance as Phyllis Gretzky in Waking Up Walter: The Walter Gretzky Story.

Filmography

Film

Television

References

External links

Canadian film actresses
Canadian television actresses
Canadian stage actresses
Canadian musical theatre actresses
Living people
Actresses from Hamilton, Ontario
Canadian Screen Award winners
20th-century Canadian actresses
21st-century Canadian actresses
1950s births
Year of birth uncertain